Pradosia glaziovii was a species of plant in the family Sapotaceae. It was endemic to Brazil. It became extinct due to habitat loss.

References

glaziovii
Extinct plants
Endemic flora of Brazil
Taxonomy articles created by Polbot